is one of the eight wards of the city of Hiroshima.

The northern portion contains what was Asa-gun and southern  Takata-gun, now defunct districts (see Takata District, Hiroshima). Asa-gun consisted of Kabe-cho, Kōyō-cho, Asa-cho. Takata-gun included Shiraki-cho. After the four towns were merged with Hiroshima in 1973, they were designated a ward and named Asakita-ku.

As of April 1, 2006, the ward has an estimated population of 156,516 and a density of 442.95 persons per km2. The total area is 353.35 km2.

The Hiroshima Bunkyo Women's College is located in Asakita-ku.

Geography

Climate
Asakita-ku has a humid subtropical climate (Köppen climate classification Cfa) characterized by cool to mild winters and hot, humid summers.

Demographics

References

Wards of Hiroshima